Shahabad railway station (Station code: SDB) is located in Kalaburagi district in the Indian state of Karnataka and serves

Shahabad, Gulbarga.  It is a station where the Wadi–Secunderabad line meets the Mumbai–Chennai line. Shahabad  has 3 platforms.

History
The Great Indian Peninsula Railway extended its Mumbai–Solapur line to Raichur in 1871. The Wadi–Secunderabad line was built in 1874 with financing by the Nizam of Hyderabad. It later became part of Nizam's Guaranteed State Railway.

Electrification
Electrification work is in progress in the Pune–Wadi–Guntakal sector. In Pune–Wadi–Guntakal sector from Bhigwan to Wadi Jn.

References

External links

Railway stations in Kalaburagi district
Railway junction stations in India
Solapur railway division